The Precious Belt Bridge or Baodai Bridge is a stone arch bridge near Suzhou, Jiangsu Province, China. The Precious Belt Bridge is located at the intersection of the Grand Canal and Tantai Lake, about 2.5 kilometer south east of Suzhou.

History
The first construction of the bridge dates back to the year 816 AD, during the mid Tang dynasty. According to written accounts, the bridge derives its name from the local prefect Wang Zhongshu, who in a selfless act had sold his precious belt in order to help finance its construction. Since then, it has been reconstructed several times. The current structure of the Precious Belt Bridge is a Ming dynasty era reconstruction of 1446 AD, during the reign of the Zhengtong Emperor.

John Barrow, while attached to the British Macartney Embassy in 1793, visited the Precious Belt Bridge during the diplomatic mission to China. He accurately described the bridge's length and the central arches being of greater height than the rest.

The bridge was included on the list of national monuments (resolution 5-285) in 2001.

Dimensions

The three central arches are enlarged to allow for the passage of – by historical standards – larger river vessels without masts.

See also
 Jade Belt Bridge
 Chinese architecture
 Architecture of the Song dynasty
 List of bridges in China

Notes

References

Needham, Joseph (1986). Science and Civilization in China: Volume 4, Part 3. Taipei: Caves Books, Ltd.

External links
 China.org.cn

Deck arch bridges
Bridges completed in 1446
Bridges in Suzhou
Stone bridges in China
Ming dynasty architecture
Major National Historical and Cultural Sites in Jiangsu
15th-century establishments in China
1446 establishments in Asia
1440s establishments in Asia